Doug or Douglas Underwood may refer to:
Doug Underwood (journalist) (born 1948), American journalist and communications scholar
Doug Underwood (speedway rider) (born 1946), Australian motorcycle speedway rider